Estádio Antônio Accioly is a multi-use stadium located in Goiânia, Brazil. It is used mostly for football matches and hosts the home matches of Atlético Clube Goianiense. The stadium has a maximum capacity of 12,500 people.

Antonio Accioly
Sports venues in Goiás